was a king of Ryukyu. His reign began in 1752. Although a period of relative stability, he had to contend with a tsunami in 1771 that devastated the Miyako Islands and Yaeyama Islands. His reign also saw the Chinese envoy Chou Huang who wrote a sixteen volume topography of the islands for the Qianlong Emperor.

References

Kings of Ryūkyū
Second Shō dynasty
1739 births
1794 deaths